

Afghanistan

Head coach:

Argentina

Head coach:

Austria

Head coach:

Belgium

Head coach:

Denmark

Head coach:

France

Head coach:

Great Britain

Head coach:

India

Head coach:NN Mukherjee

Netherlands

Head coach:

Pakistan

Head coach:

Spain

Head coach:

Switzerland

Head coach:

United States

Head coach: Henry Goode as playing manager and Kurt Orban as playing coach

Felix Ucko played in every match a different position.

Position glossary
GK=Goalkeeper
B=Back
HB=Halfback
FW=Forward
FB=Fullback
CH=Centrehalf
CM=CentreMidfield

References
 Olympic Report
 
 sports-reference

1948 Summer Olympics
 
Squads